Davidson College is a private liberal arts college in Davidson, North Carolina. It was established in 1837 by the Concord Presbytery and named after Revolutionary War general William Lee Davidson, who was killed at the nearby Battle of Cowan’s Ford.

Davidson is a four-year undergraduate institution and enrolls 1,973 students from 50 states and territories, Washington, DC, and 46 countries. Of those students, 95 percent live on campus, 71 percent study abroad, and about 25 percent participate in 21 NCAA Division I sports. The college’s athletic teams, the Wildcats, compete in the Atlantic 10 Conference for all sports except football and wrestling, which compete in the Pioneer Football League and Southern Conference respectively. Davidson's 665-acre (269 ha) main campus is located in a suburban community 19 miles (30 km) north of downtown Charlotte, North Carolina. The college also operates a 110-acre (44.5 ha) lake campus on the shores of nearby Lake Norman. 

The college offers 37 majors and 39 minors in liberal arts disciplines as well as other interdisciplinary academic programs. Academic life at Davidson is governed by an honor code that allows students to take self-scheduled, unproctored final exams. Davidson has graduated 23 Rhodes Scholars, and is one of the top producing Bachelor's institutions of Fulbright Scholars.

History
An institution of higher learning of The Presbyterian Church (USA), Davidson College was founded in 1837 by The Concord Presbytery after purchasing  of land from William Lee Davidson II. He was the son of Revolutionary War commander Brigadier General William Lee Davidson, for whom the college is named. Church records show a meeting on May 13, 1835, among subsequent meetings, by members of the Concord Presbytery making plans to purchase and perform initial construction on the land, with land payments starting Jan. 1 of the following year.  The first students graduated from Davidson in 1840 and received diplomas with the newly created college seal designed by Peter Stuart Ney, who is believed by some to be Napoleon's Marshal Ney.

In the 1850s, Davidson overcame financial difficulty by instituting "The Scholarship Plan," a program that allowed Davidson hopefuls to purchase a scholarship for $100, which could be redeemed in exchange for full tuition to Davidson until the 1870s. The college's financial situation improved dramatically in 1856 with a $250,000 donation by Maxwell Chambers, making Davidson the wealthiest college south of Princeton. The Chambers Building was erected to commemorate this gift. On November 28, 1921, the Chambers Building was destroyed in a fire but was reconstructed eight years later with funding from the Rockefeller family. The Chambers Building continues to be the primary academic building on campus.

In 1923, the Gamma chapter in North Carolina of Phi Beta Kappa was established at Davidson. Over 1500 men and 500 women have been initiated into Davidson's chapter of Phi Beta Kappa. In 1924, James Duke formed the Duke Endowment, which has provided millions of dollars to the college, including a $15 million pledge in 2007 to assist with the elimination of student loans. In 1954, The president of Georgia Tech Dr. Blake R. Van Leer and Davidson's president John Rood Cunningham arranged the first-of-its-kind joint engineering program.

On May 5, 1972, the trustees voted to allow women to enroll at Davidson as degree students for the first time. Women had attended classes as early as the 1860s but did not enjoy degree privileges. The first women to attend classes at Davidson were the five daughters of its president, the Rev. John Lycan Kirkpatrick. The first women were permitted to attend classes to increase the size of the student body during the American Civil War.  However, art major Marianna "Missy" Woodward became the first woman to graduate from Davidson.  She graduated in 1973 and was the only woman in a class of 217.

In early 2005, the college's Board of Trustees voted in a 31–5 decision to allow 20% of the board to be non-Christian. John Belk, the former mayor of Charlotte and one of the heirs of Belk Department Store, resigned in protest after more than six decades of affiliation with the college. Belk, however, continued his strong relationship with his alma mater and was honored in March 2006 at the Tenth Anniversary Celebration of the Belk Scholarship.

In 2007, Davidson eliminated the need for students to take out loans to pay for their tuition. All demonstrated need is met through grants, student employment, and parental contribution. The college claims to be the first liberal arts college in the United States to do this.

Academics

Admissions
Princeton Review and U.S. News & World Report regard Davidson's admission process as "most selective".

For the class of 2026 (enrolled fall 2022), Davidson received 6,475 applications and accepted 1,096 (16.9%). Of those, 911 applied early decision and 345 were accepted. The yield rate (the percentage of accepted students who enroll) was 49.5%. The middle 50% range of SAT scores for enrolled students was 670–740 for Evidence-Based Reading & Writing, and 680–760 for Math, while the ACT Composite range was 31–33. Enrolled freshmen represent 43 states and 29 countries; 33.5% were from the American South.

Rankings

The 2021 annual ranking by U.S. News & World Report rates Davidson College as tied for the 13th best among "National Liberal Arts Colleges" in America, 2nd in "Best Undergraduate Teaching" and 18th for "Best Value".  For 2019, Davidson College was ranked 48th overall on Forbes ' list of "America's Top Colleges," 17th best liberal arts college, and 8th in the South. In 2018, Kiplinger's Personal Finance rated Davidson College as the #1 best college for value across all colleges and universities in America.

According to The Princeton Review, Davidson is ranked among the top twenty colleges nationally for the following categories: "Best Overall Academic Experience For Undergraduates," "Professors Get High Marks" (1st), "Professors Make Themselves Accessible" (16th), "Students Study the Most" (10th), "School Runs Like Butter" (4th), "Town-Gown Relations are Great" (3rd), "Easiest Campus to Get Around" (3rd), and "Best Quality of Life (16th)."

Faculty

Davidson has a student-faculty ratio of 9:1, 69% of its classes are under 20 students.

Davidson has 201 full-time faculty members. Almost all faculty members have terminal degrees in their field, with 97% of full-time members holding PhDs.

Honor code

Davidson students are bound by a strict honor code, signed by each student at the start of their Freshman year.

The Davidson College Honor Code states: "Every student shall be honor bound to refrain from cheating (including plagiarism). Every student shall be honor bound to refrain from stealing. Every student shall be honor bound to refrain from lying about College business. Every student shall be honor bound to report immediately all violations of the Honor Code of which the student has first-hand knowledge; failure to do so shall be a violation of the Honor Code. Every student found guilty of a violation shall ordinarily be dismissed from the College. Every member of the College community is expected to be familiar with the operation of the Honor Code."

As one of the most obvious manifestations of the Honor Code, Davidson students take self-scheduled, unproctored final exams. Some exams (known as "reviews" in Davidson vernacular) are take-home, timed, and closed book. Other take-home exams may be open book or untimed. Often take-home exams may take students days to complete. Every assignment submitted at Davidson includes either an implicit or (more often) explicit pledge that the student neither gave nor received assistance on the assignment beyond the bounds of the Honor Code. The Honor Code extends beyond 'reviews,' essays, or research papers. Notes around campus are commonly seen, whether on a bulletin board or taped to a brick walkway, describing an item found at the location and the finder's contact information so that the property may be recovered.

Majors and minors
Davidson offers majors in 27 subject areas. Students can also design their own major through the Center for Interdisciplinary Studies. In addition to the one major required for graduation, students may pursue a second major, a minor, or a concentration. Its most popular majors, by 2021 graduates, were:
Econometrics & Quantitative Economics (72)
Political Science and Government (65)
Biology/Biological Sciences (61)
Psychology (44)
History (27)
Computer Science (25)
English Language and Literature (24)

Student life

Athletics

Davidson competes at the NCAA Division I level in 19 sports. Of these sports, 10 are men's and 9 are women's. Approximately 24% of the Davidson on-campus student body participates in varsity sports. Davidson has the fourth-smallest undergraduate enrollment of any school in Division I football, behind Presbyterian, VMI (Virginia Military Institute), and Wofford (smallest to largest).

Davidson's sports teams are known as the Wildcats. Their colors are red and black, although since 2008, many sports including football, men's basketball, and men's soccer have moved towards a brighter hue of red and white. The Wildcats participate as a member of the Atlantic 10 Conference in all sports other than football and wrestling. Sports that compete in other conferences include football in Division I Football Championship Subdivision Pioneer Football League, and wrestling in the Southern Conference.

Student organizations
The main student newspaper on campus is the Davidsonian, which is published weekly. The Davidsonian was founded in 1914 and has published a volume every year since then. In 2007, Davidson's Library completed a project to digitally archive all past issues of the Davidsonian.

Davidson offers over 150 student organizations on campus, including arts & culture organizations, performance groups, sports groups, political organizations, gender and sexuality groups, religious organizations, and social action groups. The Student Activities Office encourages and is available for students wishing to develop an organization not yet established at Davidson.

Most student events are sponsored by the Union Board, the student organization in charge of the student union. Union Board hosts Fall Fling and Spring Frolics, as well as popular student events like weekly trivia, Live Thursdays, and After Midnights.

A cappella
Davidson has four a cappella singing groups: the Generals, the Delilahs, Androgyny, and the Nuances.

The Davidson Generals, an all-male group, took first place in the "Rockin' the Forest" intercollegiate a cappella competition at Wake Forest University in 2005. Following the release of their third CD, "Alpha-Kappa-Pella" in 2006 they were selected for the Voices Only 2006 collegiate a cappella compilation CD with their cover of John Legend's "Used 2 Love U." They released their fourth album, titled "General Consensus," in the Spring of 2008, their fifth album, "Decorated" in Spring 2010, and most recently "Outlaws" in the Spring of 2014.

The Davidson Delilahs, an all-female group, have produced five albums to date: "Falling into Place" (2001); "Head over Heels" (2004); "Kickin' Off our Heels" (2006); "Davidson Delilahs" (2008); and "Small Town, Big Voices" (2011). The Delilahs also perform regularly throughout the year.

In 1998 Davidson Androgyny was created as a response to the absence of a co-ed a cappella group on campus. Androgyny has released four albums, "Everything But The Piano" (2001), "The A Capocalypse" (2003), "A Class Act" (2008), and their latest album "iCapella" in spring 2011. The group also sang "I'm Yours" with platinum recording artist Jason Mraz on his "Music, Magic, and Make Peace Tour" stop at Davidson College on April 19, 2008.

The Davidson Nuances, a co-ed a cappella group on campus, was organized in 2009. In addition to performing on campus and in the community, the group released its debut album "Shaken, Not Stirred" in spring 2012.

Greek life and eating houses
The fraternity and eating house system at Davidson is known as Patterson Court and is governed by the Patterson Court Council. Sigma Phi Epsilon, Phi Gamma Delta, Connor House, Phi Delta Theta, Sigma Alpha Epsilon, Warner Hall House, Kappa Sigma, Black Student Coalition, Rusk House, and Turner House all currently occupy houses on Patterson Court.

Additionally, Kappa Alpha Psi, Alpha Phi Alpha, Alpha Kappa Alpha, Delta Sigma Theta, Lambda Pi Chi, and Lambda Theta Phi maintain a presence on campus. The NPHC sorority Alpha Kappa Alpha was the first sorority of Davidson College's social community, receiving its charter in the Fall of 2008. The Multicultural Greek Council is the newest council to Davidson's Patterson Court, having been established with two Latino-interest organizations, Latinas Promoviendo Comunidad/Lambda Pi Chi sorority and Lambda Theta Phi fraternity in the spring of 2019.

In total, there are nine national fraternities, four local women's eating houses, and three sororities on campus. Approximately 80% of the female students and 40% of male students belong to a fraternity or an eating house.

The Farm
The College Farm offers fresh, naturally grown, local produce to Davidson College students through the college's Dining Services operation. The farm is a stand-alone, business-based unit of the college and does not introduce additional costs to Dining Services.

Dining
Vail Commons – The on-campus buffet style dining hall. 
Patterson Court – The area where the fraternities and eating houses are located.
Davis Café – The on-campus café located in the Student Union where students can get regular meals or late-night food.
The Wildcat Den – An on-campus café serving mainly sandwiches, salads, and soups. It is open only for lunch, and is in the Baker Sports Complex.
Summit Outpost – An on-campus coffee shop located on Patterson court.

Royal Shakespeare Company residencies
In 2002, the Royal Shakespeare Company performed William Shakespeare's The Merchant of Venice in residency at Davidson College, the RSC's second residency at a US college or university. The performance inaugurated the Duke Family Performance Hall. In March 2005, the RSC returned to Davidson and was in residency for most of the month, performing The Two Gentlemen of Verona and Julius Caesar by William Shakespeare, as well as numerous educational activities, many of which were open to the general public. In February 2006, their artists directed scenes from Shakespeare's plays and other theatrical materials inspired by Shakespeare, entitled For Every Passion, Something, with Davidson students as actors. The productions Infinite Variety and For Every Passion Something were presented at the Edinburgh Festival Fringe in Edinburgh, Scotland. In February 2007, the Royal Shakespeare Company performed Shakespeare's Pericles and The Winter's Tale, as well as Roy Williams's Days of Significance, in the Duke Family Performance Hall. In 2008, the RSC conducted educational programs, similar to those they presented in 2006. Also during this residency, playwright Rona Munro developed a new play, Little Eagles.

Financial aid
In 2007, Davidson College announced that all students would have their demonstrated financial need met by grants and student employment; loans would no longer be a component of any Davidson financial aid package. The Duke Endowment pledged $15,000,000 to support the initiative and it was named The Davidson Trust.

In addition to not including loans in their financial aid packages, Davidson's 2014 capital campaign adding 156 new scholarships funded with $88 million. Davidson states that they are committed to providing 100% of demonstrated need of all students, with 44% of students receiving need-based aid and over 50% receiving some form of financial aid.

Notable alumni

Davidson has many notable graduates, particularly in politics, athletics, and the arts. These include US Secretary of State Dean Rusk, several governors of North and South Carolina, former White House Press Secretary Tony Snow, former US Secretary of Transportation Anthony Foxx, Deputy White House Counsel in the Bill Clinton administration, Vincent Foster, mystery writer Patricia Cornwell, Susannah Wellford, President and Founder of Running Start: Bringing Young Women to Politics, and Pulitzer Prize-winning poet, Charles Wright.  Woodrow Wilson, the 28th President of the United States, attended Davidson for one year before transferring to Princeton University, American novelist and essayist William Styron, author of Sophie's Choice and The Confessions of Nat Turner, attended Davidson but transferred to Duke University. The 2015 and 2016 National Basketball Association's Most Valuable Player and 4-time champion Stephen Curry also attended and completed his BA in May 2022. The German politician Kurt Biedenkopf, former Minister President of Saxony and former President of the Bundesrat, attended Davidson College for a year as an exchange student.

See also

 Davidson College Arboretum

References

External links

 
 Official athletics website

 
Universities and colleges in Mecklenburg County, North Carolina
Liberal arts colleges in North Carolina
Universities and colleges accredited by the Southern Association of Colleges and Schools
Private universities and colleges in North Carolina
Universities and colleges affiliated with the Presbyterian Church (USA)
Educational institutions established in 1837
1837 establishments in North Carolina